Daniel Czepko von Reigersfeld (1605–1660) was a German Lutheran poet and dramatist, known for his mystical verse influenced by Jacob Böhme. "Czepko" was his family name, so he is commonly known as Daniel Czepko.

Life
His father was a Lutheran pastor. He studied medicine at Leipzig, and then went to Strasbourg to study law. He became acquainted with Matthias Bernegger, before returning to Silesia.

Works
Czepko wrote a collection of religious epigrams, the Sexcenta Monodisticha Sapientum. It was an influence on Angelus Silesius.

Notes

External links
WorldCat page
CERL page

1605 births
1660 deaths
17th-century German poets
17th-century German lawyers
People from Austrian Silesia
German male poets